In mathematics, an event that occurs with high probability (often shortened to w.h.p. or WHP) is one whose probability depends on a certain number n and goes to 1 as n goes to infinity, i.e. the probability of the event occurring can be made as close to 1 as desired by making n big enough.

Applications
The term WHP is especially used in computer science, in the analysis of probabilistic algorithms. For example, consider a certain probabilistic algorithm on a graph with n nodes. This fact is expressed shortly by saying that the algorithm is correct WHP.

Some examples where this term is used are:
 Miller–Rabin primality test: a probabilistic algorithm for testing whether a given number n is prime or composite. If n is composite, the test will detect n as composite WHP. There is a small chance that we are unlucky and the test will think that n is prime. But, the probability of error can be reduced indefinitely by running the test many times with different randomizations.
 Freivalds' algorithm: a randomized algorithm for verifying matrix multiplication. It runs faster than deterministic algorithms WHP.
 Treap: a randomized binary search tree. Its height is logarithmic WHP. Fusion tree is a related data structure.
 Online codes: randomized codes which allow the user to recover the original message WHP.
 BQP: a complexity class of problems for which there are polynomial-time quantum algorithms which are correct WHP.
 Probably approximately correct learning: A process for machine-learning in which the learned function has low generalization-error WHP.
 Gossip protocols: a communication protocol used in distributed systems to reliably deliver messages to the whole cluster using a constant amount of network resources on each node and ensuring no single point of failure.

See also 
 Randomized algorithm
 Almost surely

References 
 
 

Probability theory
Randomized algorithms